Kadir Hodžić (born 5 August 1994) is a Bosnian footballer who plays for BK Häcken.

Career

Club career
Hodžić started his career with Skene IF. After a year with Kinna IF, it was confirmed in November 2011, that 17-year old Hodžić had joined IF Elfsborg's U21 team, where he signed a two-year contract. In the 2014 season, Hodzic returned to Kinna IF, where he played 20 games and scored four goals in Division 3.

On 16 March 2020, Dalkurd FF confirmed the signing of Hodžić.

On 19 February 2022, Hodžić signed a three-year contract with BK Häcken.

Honours 
BK Häcken

 Allsvenskan: 2022

References

External links 
 
 Kadir Hodžić at Idrott Online

1994 births
Living people
People from Srebrenica
Bosnia and Herzegovina footballers
Swedish footballers
Bosnia and Herzegovina emigrants to Sweden
Association football defenders
Motala AIF players
Norrby IF players
AFC Eskilstuna players
Dalkurd FF players
Mjällby AIF players
BK Häcken players
Allsvenskan players
Superettan players
Ettan Fotboll players
Division 2 (Swedish football) players
Division 3 (Swedish football) players